William Alfred Gibson  (1869 – 6 October 1929) was an Australian film producer and exhibitor best known for his collaboration with Millard Johnson. He was one of the producers of The Story of the Kelly Gang (1906) and helped establish Amalgamated Pictures.

Gibson originally worked as a chemist for William Johnson and supplied chemicals to early film exhibitors. He went into exhibition himself with Johnson's son Millard, later expanding into film processing and photography.

He and Johnson helped produce The Story of the Kelly Gang (1906), arguably the world's first feature film. This was made with the Tait brothers with whom Gibson and Johnson formed Amalgamated Pictures.

This later merged with other companies to become Australasian Films and Union Theatres, the famous "Combine" which dominated Australian distribution and exhibition in the 1920s; Gibson served as its managing director.

Honour 
He was awarded an OBE on 19 October 1920.

References

External links
William Gibson at Brighton Cemetery
William Gibson at National Film and Sound Archive

1900s in Australian cinema
1910s in Australian cinema
Australian film producers
1929 deaths
1869 births
Officers of the Order of the British Empire